Buzara lageos is a moth of the family Erebidae. It is found in Indonesia.

References

Calpinae
Moths described in 1852